Arnaud Marchois (born 24 June 1983) is a French rugby union footballer, currently playing for Lyon OU in the Top 14. His usual position is at Lock. Prior to joining Lyon OU he played for Stade Français where he won the Top 14 in 2003, 2004 and 2007.

Honours 
 Top 14, 2003, 2004 and 2007 with Stade Français

References

External links
ERC stats

1983 births
Living people
People from Châtenay-Malabry
French rugby union players
Lyon OU players
Stade Français players
Sportspeople from Hauts-de-Seine
Rugby union locks